Connor Derek Teale (born 8 October 2002 in Harlow, Essex) is an English professional footballer who plays as a defender for Farsley Celtic, on loan from Fleetwood Town.

Career
Teale started his career in the Academy of Leeds United and progressed to be a member of the under-18 squad, featuring in the under-18 Premier League and the FA Youth Cup. He was expected to progress onto the under-23 squad having already been named as an unused sub for the EFL Trophy against Accrington Stanley in September 2020, which Leeds infamously lost 7–0.

On 19 April 2021, with his contract expiring, he decided to leave Leeds and joined EFL League One side Fleetwood Town, signing his first professional contract until the end of the 2022–23 season with the club holding an option for a further year. He went straight into the Development Squad which was managed by Stephen Crainey. He made two first team appearances in the EFL Trophy matches against Barrow and Bolton Wanderers in October and November 2021.

On 24 December 2021, he was sent out on loan to Northern Premier League Division One West side Marine for an initial month, as the club were missing three out of four centre backs. On 28 January 2022, he was recalled from his loan spell by Fleetwood, having made four starts and one sub appearance for the Mariners.

On the same day it was announced that he had instead been sent out on loan to National League North side Curzon Ashton on an initial one-month deal. On 28 February 2022, he extended his stay at Curzon Ashton for a further month after he had been an ever-present figure in the side's backline and was instrumental in the team keeping a number of clean sheets in the previous month.

On 3 December 2022, Teale joined National League North side Farsley Celtic on a one-month loan deal.

Career statistics

References

External links

2002 births
Living people
People from Harlow
Fleetwood Town F.C. players
Marine F.C. players
Curzon Ashton F.C. players
Farsley Celtic F.C. players
National League (English football) players
Northern Premier League players
Association football defenders
English footballers